Adiopa is a genus of moths of the family Noctuidae.

Species
Adiopa disgrega (Moschler, 1890)
Adiopa marama (Schaus, 1904)

References
 
 

Calpinae
Noctuoidea genera